Lough Finn is a freshwater lough (lake) in County Donegal, Ireland. The lough, along with its neighbouring village of Fintown, was named after a mythological woman, Finngeal, who drowned in the lake after attempting to save her wounded brother Feargamhain. The water from Lough Finn outflows into the River Finn.

Gallery

See also
List of loughs in Ireland

References

Finn
Gaeltacht places in County Donegal